"I Wasn't the One (Who Said Goodbye)" is the second single from Agnetha Fältskog's third English-language solo album, I Stand Alone, released in 1987.

The song is a duet with the album's producer Peter Cetera, the former lead singer and bass guitar player for the American rock band Chicago. They also recorded a Spanish-language version of the song, "Yo No Fui (Quien Dijo Adiós)", for the South American market, and which was included on the South American version of I Stand Alone.

The song peaked at number 93 in both the United States and Canada. It was a more successful Adult Contemporary hit peaking at number 19 on the Billboard AC chart and number 21 on RPM AC chart in Canada. Fältskog did not do any promotion for the song in North America.

Music video
A music video was shot in Stockholm, but did not show Cetera on camera.

Formats and track listings
The single was released in four formats:
7"-single
 "I Wasn't The One (Who Said Goodbye)"  4:12
 "If You Need Somebody Tonight" 3:30
12"-single
 "I Wasn't The One (Who Said Goodbye)" [Extended Version] 6:00
 "Yo No Fui (Quien Dijo Adiós)" 4:12
 "If You Need Somebody Tonight" 3:30
Cassette single [USA]
 "I Wasn't The One (Who Said Goodbye)"  4:06
 "If You Need Somebody Tonight" 3:32
3"-CD-single [Japan]
 "I Wasn't The One (Who Said Goodbye)"
 "If You Need Somebody Tonight"

Weekly charts

External links
"I Wasn't The One (Who Said Good-Bye)" Official Agnetha Fältskog website

References

1987 songs
1988 singles
Agnetha Fältskog songs
Peter Cetera songs
Male–female vocal duets
Songs written by Mark Mueller
Songs written by Aaron Zigman